The vice president of Mali is an ad hoc governmental position in Mali. There is no provision for a vice president in the Constitution of Mali and the position has only existed under military regimes.

List of vice president of Mali

See also
 Politics of Mali
 List of heads of state of Mali
 First Lady of Mali
 List of prime ministers of Mali

References

Lists of vice presidents
 
Political history of Mali
Vice President